Ademosynidae is an extinct family of beetles in the order Coleoptera. There are about 10 genera and more than 40 described species in Ademosynidae.

Genera
These 10 genera belong to the family Ademosynidae:
 † Ademosyne Handlirsch, 1906 
 † Atalosyne Ren, 1995 
 † Cephalosyne Ponomarenko, 1969 
 † Chaocoleus Ponomarenko, Yan & Huang, 2014 
 † Dolichosyne Ponomarenko, 1969 
 † Eremisyne Wang 1998 
 † Gnathosyne Ponomarenko, 1969 
 † Grammositum Dunstan 1923 
 † Petrosyne Ponomarenko, 1969 
 † Sphaerosyne Ponomarenko, 1969

References

Permosynoidea
Beetle families
Prehistoric insect families